"I'm Throwed" is the second single from Paul Wall's album, Get Money, Stay True. The song was released in late March 2007, nearly a week before the release of the album. The song is produced by and features Jermaine Dupri. Dupri uses the sounds from a Theremin as a part of the loop in the song. A music video was shot and released, featuring appearances by TV Johnny and Paul Wall's Son, William "Fat Pat" Slayton. In the issue dated April 28, 2007, the single debuted on the Billboard Hot 100 at number 94, eventually peaking at number 87.

Remix
There is also a remix version of the song that features Bow Wow, Chamillionaire and Lil' Keke, in addition to Dupri.

Charts

References

2006 songs
2007 singles
Paul Wall songs
Jermaine Dupri songs
Asylum Records singles
Atlantic Records singles
Song recordings produced by Jermaine Dupri
Songs written by Jermaine Dupri
Songs written by LRoc
Songs written by Paul Wall